Free for All is a jazz album by Art Blakey & the Jazz Messengers released on Blue Note. Recorded in February 1964, it was released the following year. It was originally titled Free Fall.

The Allmusic review by Al Campbell awards the album 4 stars and states, "This edition of the Jazz Messengers had been together since 1961 with a lineup that would be hard to beat: Freddie Hubbard on trumpet... Wayne Shorter on tenor sax, Curtis Fuller on trombone, Cedar Walton on piano, and Reggie Workman on bass. Shorter's title track is one of the finest moments in the Jazz Messengers' history."

Composition
Freddie Hubbard's composition "The Core" is dedicated to the CORE (Congress of Racial Equality) and expresses "Hubbard's admiration of that organization's persistence and resourcefulness in its work for total, meaningful equality." "They're getting", he explains, "at the core, at the center of the kinds of change that have to take place before this society is really open to everyone. And more than any other group, CORE is getting to youth, and that's where the center of change is." The piece was called that way also because Hubbard thought that the musicians "got at some of the core of jazz – the basic feelings and rhythms that are at the foundation of music."

"Pensativa" was composed by Fischer, but was arranged by Hubbard for the occasion: "I was playing a gig in Long Island", he recalls, "and the pianist started playing it. The mood got me, this feeling of a pensive woman. And the melody was so beautiful that, after I'd gotten home, I couldn't get it out of my mind."

The album was intended to have featured three more tunes, Shorter's "Eva" and two vocals by Wellington Blakey, Blakey's cousin. These were attempted, but no valid takes were recorded. Additionally, the musicians tried a second take of "Free for All", an attempt that producer Lion had to stop because Blakey's drums broke, according to his log. Indeed, said alternate take, first released on the limited 2014 Japanese SHM-CD, is three minutes shorter.

Track listing

Original vinyl

2014 Blue Note SHM-CD Remaster Edition (Japan Release)

Personnel
 Art Blakey – drums
 Freddie Hubbard – trumpet
 Curtis Fuller – trombone
 Wayne Shorter – tenor saxophone
 Cedar Walton – piano
 Reggie Workman – bass

References 

Art Blakey albums
The Jazz Messengers albums
1964 albums
Blue Note Records albums
Albums produced by Alfred Lion